Ruzhou No. 2 High School is a senior high school in Ruzhou, Pingdingshan, Henan, China.

In 2004 the Ruzhou massacre occurred at the school; Yan Yanming was accused of killing eight students and injuring four at a boys' dormitory at the school.

References

Senior secondary schools in China
Buildings and structures in Henan
Education in Henan
Boarding schools in China